Borough Green & Wrotham railway station is located in Borough Green in Kent, England. Train services are provided by Southeastern.

History
The station was later renamed Wrotham & Boro Green. The goods yard had three sidings. One of them served a goods shed, another extended northwards to serve a Ragstone quarry. A 5-ton capacity crane was provided. Freight facilities were withdrawn on 9 September 1968. East of the station, there was a private siding at Platt, and a public siding at Offham. This closed on 6 September 1961.

In Spring 2008, the concrete footbridge spanning the tracks to link the platforms was condemned and replaced by a new bridge immediately to the west.

The ticket office in the 'down side' station building is staffed for part of the day. At other times, a passenger-operated ticket machine, installed in the mid-2000s at the station entrance, suffices.

Services
All services at Borough Green & Wrotham are operated by Southeastern using  and  EMUs.

The typical off-peak service in trains per hour is:
 1 tph to 
 1 tph to London Charing Cross

During the peak hours, the station is served by an additional hourly service between London Victoria and Ashford International.

On Sundays, the services between London Charing Cross and Maidstone East do not run.

References
References

Sources

External links 

Tonbridge and Malling
Railway stations in Kent
DfT Category D stations
Former London, Chatham and Dover Railway stations
Railway stations in Great Britain opened in 1874
Railway stations served by Southeastern